Portrait of Jacopo Sannazaro, also known as Portrait of a Man, is an oil painting by the Venetian master Titian, dated to about 1513. It is part of the Royal Collection, and hangs in Buckingham Palace.

Subject 
Both the names formerly given to this picture, Boccaccio and Alessandro de' Medici, are incorrect. The sitter is now thought to be Jacopo Sannazaro, a poet and humanist from Naples. This identification was first proposed by Georg Gronau in 1895, and is supported by an early copy of the painting (Walker Art Gallery, Liverpool) inscribed Sincerus Sannzarius ("Actius Sincerus" was a known alias of Sannazaro).

History 
The style of the sitter's clothing and hair suggest a date closer to 1513; certainly before 1520. According to Gronau, "It has in style its companion in the Parma at Vienna, and must have been painted about 1511. It shows the period of transition from the purely Giorgionesque style to Titian's quite personal one."

Analysis 

Georg Gronau notes how a comparison of the few single portraits belonging to Titian's earlier years leads us to observe that in them the hands are made use of as an essential characteristic of the personality. Here the sitter lets his only hand visible rest on a book lying on the parapet in front, while his eyes wander away into space. This makes us suppose him a literary man.

Charles Ricketts, writing in 1910, appraises the work highly:

Provenance 
This portrait is well known from Van Dalen's engraving. It is said to have belonged to the collection of Charles I; later in the Cabinet Van Reynst, which, after the death of its owner, was acquired by the States of Holland and West Friesland and presented to Charles II in 1660.

Copies

See also 

 Dutch Gift

References

Sources 
 Whitaker, Lucy; Clayton, Martin (2007). The Art of Italy in the Royal Collection: Renaissance & Baroque. St James's Palace, London: Royal Collection Enterprises Ltd. pp. 31, 32, 188, 189.
 "Portrait of Jacopo Sannazaro (1458-1530) c. 1514-18". Royal Collection Trust. Accessed 21 August 2022.

Attribution:

Sannazaro
1510s paintings
Paintings in the Royal Collection of the United Kingdom